Danesh (Persian: دانش; Deutsche Morgenländische Gesellschaft: Daneš; English: "knowledge") is the title of seven different Persian-language magazines published since 1882. This biweekly science magazine was the first one published in Tehran by the University of Dār al-fonūn in 1882.

By order of the Minister of Science 'Alīqolī Khan Moḵber-al-Dawla, who worked under Nāṣer-al-Dīn Shah (1264-1313 / 1848-96), a total of 14 issues were edited.

Dānesh was the first free-of-charge magazine in Iran which offered free advertising as well. The magazine probably aimed to close the gap caused by the closure of the well-known science magazine Rūz-nāma -ye'elmī . The leading editor was Moḥammad Kāẓem, a science teacher at Dār al-fonūn, who had studied in Europe. In addition to Kāẓem, other teachers also published articles on scientific and medical topics and their own opinions. Moreover, the magazine was considered to be a mouthpiece of the Ministry of Science.

References

External links
 Danesh in the Encyclopædia Iranica
 Online-Version: Dāneš
 Digital Collections: Arabische, persische und osmanisch-türkische Periodika

1882 establishments in Iran
Biweekly magazines
Defunct magazines published in Iran
Free magazines
Magazines established in 1882
Magazines published in Tehran
Persian-language magazines
Science and technology magazines
Weekly magazines published in Iran
Magazines with year of disestablishment missing